Mango TV is a streaming platform owned by HBS.

Original drama

Short

Distribution

Variety

Notes

References 

Chinese television series
Lists of television series by streaming service